The Long Arm (USA: The Third Key) is a 1956 British film noir police procedural crime film starring Jack Hawkins. The film, which was based on a screenplay by Robert Barr and Janet Green, was directed by Charles Frend and produced by Michael Balcon. It was shot on location in London and Snowdonia in North Wales.

Two years later Hawkins played a similar role in John Ford's Gideon's Day, a film based on books by John Creasey.

Plot
When police respond to a burglar alarm at premises in Long Acre, Central London, they find nothing amiss after meeting the nightwatchman, who allows them to search the premises. However, the next day the safe, which had been opened with a key, is found empty. Supt Tom Halliday (Jack Hawkins) and his new Detective Sergeant Ward (John Stratton), begin searching for the fraudulent nightwatchman.

Halliday eventually concludes that the false nightwatchman has committed 14 safe-breaking jobs across the country, all on the same type of safe, and all completed with genuine keys. Visiting the safe manufacturer, Halliday gets the names of all current and former staff, but they are all cleared. When another safe is broken into, a bystander is run over by the getaway car as it makes its escape. However, the victim manages to pass limited information to the police before dying. The hit-and-run vehicle is found in a scrapyard. The car has been stolen from a Mrs Elliot. Inside they find a newspaper that leads them to a garage in North Wales and to a Mr Gilson, a deceased former employee of the safe manufacturer.

Halliday finds that there are 28 more safes of the same type in London. He also finds that the thief is being tipped off by an insurance agent about which safes contain significant amounts of cash. The police arrange with the owner of a safe located in the Royal Festival Hall to let the insurance agent know about gala nights, which generate a lot of cash that will be stored in the safe overnight. They tail the insurance agent to a meeting with Mrs Elliot, the woman whose car was stolen. She is identified as Mrs Gilson, the wife of the apparently dead safe key maker.

Halliday and Ward deduce that Gilson faked his own death after spending years making duplicate keys for all the safes his company produced. Gilson breaks into the Royal Festival Hall, but the detectives are waiting. Mrs Gilson arrives and waits in her car in the nearby car park. After a short scuffle, Mr Gilson punches Ward and make a run for it, but is soon re-captured by the police. Meantime, Halliday jumps on the bonnet of Mrs Gilson's car and breaks the windscreen, preventing Mrs Gilson from seeing where she is driving. Halliday is thrown from the car bonnet and lands on the ground. Both Mr and Mrs Gilson are arrested and the case is solved.

Cast

 Jack Hawkins as Supt Tom Halliday
 John Stratton as Sergeant Ward
 Dorothy Alison as Mary Halliday
 Michael Brooke as Tony Halliday
 Sam Kydd as Police control room Operator
 Glyn Houston as Police Sergeant
 Richard Leech as Gilson, the burglar
 Newton Blick as Deputy Commander Harris
 Geoffrey Keen as Chief Superintendent Malcolm
 Sydney Tafler as Mr Stone
 Ursula Howells as Mrs Elliott (Mrs Gilson)
 Peter Burton as Mr Creasey, insurance agent
 George Rose as Slob, the informer
 Arthur Rigby as Detective Inspector at Chester
 Ralph Truman as Colonel Blenkinsop
 Ian Bannen as Stanley James, hit-and-run victim
 John Warwick as Detective Inspector at Shipping Office
 Joss Ambler as Cashier at Shipping Office
 Harry Locke as secondhand dealer
 Alec McCowen as doctor in the hospital
 Nicholas Parsons as PC Bates
 Warwick Ashton as Newspaper Circulation Manager
 David Davies as Welsh Police Constable
 John Welsh as House Agent at Shepperton
 Richard Davies as a Police Officer at newsagent
 Maureen Delany as daily help
 Jameson Clark as Detective Superintendent Ogilvie
 William Mervyn as Manager of the Royal Festival Hall
 Harold Goodwin as a librarian
 Meredith Edwards as Mr Thomas, garage owner

Reception
The film premiered at Gaumont Haymarket in London on 22 June 1956. However, the reviewer for The Times was not impressed, and found the story implausible and "not quite clever enough" even though it used a documentary filming style.
It won the Silver Bear for an Outstanding Single Achievement award at the 6th Berlin International Film Festival.

References

External links

1956 films
1956 crime films
British crime films
British black-and-white films
Procedural films
Films set in London
Ealing Studios films
Films directed by Charles Frend
Films produced by Michael Balcon
1950s English-language films
1950s British films
Cultural depictions of Metropolitan Police officers